Devi Ajith (born 28 March 1973) is an Indian actress, dancer and a television personality in the Malayalam film industry. She is known for her roles in Trivandrum Lodge and Immanuel. She is also seen in a short film named Virgin Road. Also runs a boutique in Trivandrum named Scarlet for the past 20 years.

Personal life

Born and brought up in Trivandrum, Kerala, she started her career with Asianet by anchoring Pattupetty. Daughter of professors V. Ramachandran Nair and S. Lalithambika Devi. Devi got married at the age of 19 to (Late) Ajith Kumar, producer of The Car and has a daughter, Nandana Ajith (b. 1993), who works as digital analyst in Fashionobi ; Milan, Italy. Her husband died in a car accident in 1997. She is remarried to Ashok Kumar Vasudevan since 22 November 2009. Her daughter got married in 2021.

Filmography

Other works

As costume designer (film)
The Car (1997)

As producer (film)
 Panchara Paalu Mittayi (Pre-production)
 The Car (1997)

Television

TV serials
 Manal Nagaram (DD Malayalam)
 Nakshatrangal Ariyate (DD Malayalam)
 Eeran Nilavu (Flowers Tv)
 Kshanaprabhachanchalam (Amrita TV)
 Chackoyum Maryyum (Mazhavil Manorama)
 Varnappakittu (Surya TV)
 Aanpirannol (Amrita TV)
Ammayariyathe ( Asianet)

TV shows as a host
Pattupetty (Asianet)
Kalyan Cine Show (Asianet)
Heartbeats (Asianet)
Tele Quiz (Asianet)
Super Hitukalude Katha (Asianet)
Comedy Times (Surya TV)
Where To?
Devamrutham (Kaumudy TV)
Onam Payasamela (Flowers Tv)
Ponnonanaalile Payasamela  (Kaumudy TV)

TV shows as a guest
 Comedy Stars (Asianet)
 Annie's Kitchen (Amrita TV)
 I Personally (Kappa TV)
 Star Jam (Kappa TV)
 Run Baby Run (Asianet)
 Onnum Onnum Moonu (Mazhavil Manorama)
 Dream Drive (Kaumudy TV)
 On the Spot (One TV)
 Ivide Ingananu Bhai (Mazhavil Manorama)
 Comedy Super Nite (Flowers Tv)
 Malayali Darbar (Amrita TV) - Panelist
 Smart Show (Flowers Tv) - Participant
 Bold and Beautiful  (DD Malayalam)
 Day with a Star (Kaumudy TV)

Awards

Akama International Award Best Actress Award  
 Alappy Shortfilm fest 2018 - Best actress award for short film 'NeeThee' Directed by Panayam Liju,Produced by Sreekala Rajendraprasad.
Flowers TV awards 2017-Best supporting actress (spl jury) for Eeran Nilavu
Flowers Gulf Film Awards 2016-Special Jury Award for various films
G-Tec G Zoom Film - TV Awards 2013 - Special Award for Acting talent
 MBA (Media Business Art) Awards 2013
Good Knight Film and Business Awards 2017

References

External links
 

Living people
1973 births
Actresses in Malayalam cinema
Actresses from Kerala
Actresses in Tamil cinema
Television personalities from Kerala
Actresses in Malayalam television
Indian television actresses